A Legislative Assembly election was held in Manipur on 4 March and 8 March 2017 to elect the 60 members of the Manipur Legislative Assembly,
 as the term of the previous Assembly was to end on 18 March 2017. Voter-verified paper audit trail (VVPAT) machines were used along with Electronic Voting Machines (EVMs) in four assembly constituencies in Manipur.

Background
In the last election, held in 2012, the Congress won 42 seats and incumbent Chief Minister Okram Ibobi Singh was re-elected. In 2014, the Manipur State Congress Party, with its five Members of Legislative Assembly, joined the ruling Congress.

Opinion polls

Results
Results were declared on 11 March 2017.

Results by constituency

Government formation 
On 15 March 2017, N. Biren Singh was sworn as the Chief Minister, having formed a coalition with National People's Party, Naga People's Front and the Lok Janshakti Party. This marked the first time that the Bharatiya Janata Party has formed a government in Manipur. The Indian National Congress remained the single largest party in the legislature.

By-elections

References

External links
 Manipur election 2017 date 

2017 State Assembly elections in India
2017
2017